Stephan Cohen (born 14 August 1971) is a French pocket billiards player. In 2009, he won the Dragon 14.1 Tournament by defeating Mika Immonen of Finland.

Achievements
 2009 Dragon 14.1 Tournament
 2011 European Pool Championship 10-Ball

References

French pool players
1971 births
Living people
World Games bronze medalists
Competitors at the 2009 World Games
21st-century French people